David Alexius Guttman (24 July 1883 – 9 December 1940) was a Swedish long-distance runner. He competed in the marathon at the 1912 Summer Olympics. Guttman committed suicide by hanging in 1940.

References

External links
 

1883 births
1940 suicides
Athletes (track and field) at the 1912 Summer Olympics
Swedish male long-distance runners
Swedish male marathon runners
Olympic athletes of Sweden
Sportspeople from Jämtland County
Suicides by hanging in Sweden
20th-century Swedish people